The World Fantasy Awards are given each year by the World Fantasy Convention for the best fantasy fiction and art published in English during the preceding calendar year. The awards have been described by sources such as The Guardian as a "prestigious fantasy prize", and one of the three most renowned speculative fiction awards, along with the Hugo and Nebula Awards (which cover both fantasy and science fiction). The World Fantasy Special Award—Professional is given each year to individuals for their professional work in the preceding calendar year in fields related to fantasy that is not covered by other World Fantasy Award categories. These have included editors of magazines and novels, publishers, and authors of non-fiction works. Occasionally, especially in the first few years of the award, some publishing companies were nominated along with individual editors and publishers. The nomination reasons were not specified in the first year of the award, and have sometimes not been specified beyond "contributions to the genre". Individuals are also eligible for the Special Award—Non-professional category for their non-professional work. The World Fantasy Special Award—Professional has been awarded annually since 1975.

World Fantasy Award nominees and winners are decided by attendees and judges at the annual World Fantasy Convention. A ballot is posted in June for attendees of the current and previous two conferences to determine two of the finalists, and a panel of five judges adds three or more nominees before voting on the overall winner. The panel of judges is typically made up of fantasy authors and is chosen each year by the World Fantasy Awards Administration, which has the power to break ties. The final results are presented at the World Fantasy Convention at the end of October. Winners were presented with a statue in the form of a bust of H. P. Lovecraft through the 2015 awards; more recent winners receive a statuette of a tree.

During the 48 nomination years, 162 individuals and four publishing companies have been nominated; 57 people have won, including ties and co-nominees. For his work at Donald M. Grant, Publisher Donald M. Grant has won three times out of eight nominations, and six other nominees have won twice. Ian Ballantine and Betty Ballantine have won twice out of two nominations each for their non-fiction and publishing work, and Peter Crowther twice out of four nominations for his work at PS Publishing. Edward L. Ferman won twice out of six nominations for his work at The Magazine of Fantasy & Science Fiction, Stephen Jones twice out of six for his editing and anthology work, and Gordon Van Gelder twice out of seven nominations for his editing work in both books and The Magazine of Fantasy & Science Fiction. Ellen Datlow has received the most nominations with ten, winning once, for her editing and anthology work, and David Pringle has the most nominations without winning with five, for his work at Interzone and for "contributions to the genre".

Winners and nominees
In the following table, the years correspond to the date of the ceremony, rather than when the work was performed. The table includes the stated reason the individual (or company) was nominated, which may not have been the only fantasy-related professional work they did during the previous calendar year. "N/A" in the reason column represents a nomination where no reason was given. Entries with a blue background and an asterisk (*) next to the individual's name have won the award; those with a white background are the other nominees on the shortlist.

  *   Winners

See also
 World Fantasy Convention

References

External links
 World Fantasy Convention official site

Special Professional